Yanet Bermoy Acosta (born 29 May 1987, in Cienfuegos) is a Cuban judoka. She won the silver medal in the Women's 48 kg at the 2008 Summer Olympics and the silver medal in the Women's 52 kg at the 2012 Summer Olympics.

References

External links
 
 
 

1987 births
Living people
Judoka at the 2007 Pan American Games
Judoka at the 2008 Summer Olympics
Judoka at the 2011 Pan American Games
Judoka at the 2012 Summer Olympics
Olympic judoka of Cuba
Olympic silver medalists for Cuba
Olympic medalists in judo
Medalists at the 2012 Summer Olympics
Medalists at the 2008 Summer Olympics
People from Cienfuegos
Cuban female judoka
Pan American Games gold medalists for Cuba
Pan American Games medalists in judo
Universiade medalists in judo
Central American and Caribbean Games gold medalists for Cuba
Competitors at the 2006 Central American and Caribbean Games
Universiade bronze medalists for Cuba
Central American and Caribbean Games medalists in judo
Medalists at the 2009 Summer Universiade
Medalists at the 2013 Summer Universiade
Medalists at the 2007 Pan American Games
Medalists at the 2011 Pan American Games
21st-century Cuban women